Makaryevka is a rural locality (a selo) and the administrative center of Makaryevsky Selsoviet of Altaysky District, Altai Krai, Russia. The population was 444 as of 2016. There are 10 streets.

Geography 
Makaryevka is located 11 km northwest of Altayskoye (the district's administrative centre) by road. Altayskoye is the nearest rural locality.

Ethnicity 
The village is inhabited by Russians and others.

References 

Rural localities in Altaysky District, Altai Krai